Oravița is a town in the Banat region of Romania, in Caraș-Severin County, with a population of 11,382 in 2011. Its theater is a fully functional scaled down version of the old Burgtheater in Vienna. 

Six villages are administered by the town: Agadici (Agadics; Agaditsch), Brădișoru de Jos (until 1960 Maidan; Majdán), Broșteni (Brostyán), Ciclova Montană (Csiklóbánya; Montan-Tschiklowa), Marila (Marillavölgy; Marillathal) and Răchitova (Rakitova).

Etymology
The name of the town is derived from the Slavic word orah(ov), meaning "(of) walnut" with suffix -ița.

Villages

Agadici
The history of Agadici can be traced back to at least the 17th century, when records noted a population of "800 souls". Today, there are fewer than 200 people living in Agadici. Agadici is a word derived from Turkish: Aga meaning 'colonel' and dici meaning 'daughter'. Therefore, Agadici means "daughter of the colonel". The town was supposedly named after a colonel's daughter when the Ottoman Empire occupied the land that is now the Banat (see the Temeşvar Eyalet).

Ciclova Montană
The second-oldest beer in what is now Romania was produced in Ciclova; it is first attested in a document of 1728. In the beginning, production was under the management and patronage of the local Catholic monastery. Known as "bere Ciclova" in later years, the firm went bankrupt in 1996.

Natives
 Florin Bătrânu
 Cristian Boldea
 Radu Pavel Gheo
 Adolf Humborg
 Kálmán Kerpely
 András Lévai
 Simeon Mangiuca
 Kálmán Mihalik

Climate
Oravița has a humid continental climate (Cfb in the Köppen climate classification).

Anina–Oravița railway

The rail line from Anina to Oravița was the first mountain railway in Hungary and today's Romania. Opened in 1863, it is still in use today for touristic purposes, and it is one of the most beautiful railways in Europe due to very picturesque landscapes, viaducts,  and long tunnels.

References

Populated places in Caraș-Severin County
Localities in Romanian Banat
Towns in Romania
Mining communities in Romania
Place names of Slavic origin in Romania
Capitals of former Romanian counties